Discovery High School may refer to:
Discovery High School, a high school in El Paso County, Colorado
Discovery High School (Georgia), a high school in Lawrenceville, Georgia
Discovery Alternative High School, a high school in Kent County, Michigan
Discovery High School, a high school in New York City
Discovery High School (Washington), a high school in Longview Public Schools in Longview, Washington
Discovery High School of Newton-Conover, a high school in Newton, North Carolina
Discovery Alternative High School, a high school in South Kitsap School District, Washington

See also
 Discovery Academy (disambiguation)
 Discovery School (disambiguation)